Patrick Leroy "Sleepy" Brown (born January 24, 1970) is an American singer-songwriter and record producer from Savannah, Georgia. He is one-third of the successful Atlanta-based production team of Organized Noize, which has created hits for acts such as Outkast, Goodie Mob and TLC. TLC's "Waterfalls", penned by Brown and Organized Noize's Rico Wade and Ray Murray, was a #1 hit single on Billboard's Hot 100 in the summer of 1995.

Career
Patrick Brown was born in Savannah on January 24, 1970.

Besides production work Brown also records as an artist himself, both for his own recordings (including his 2004 single "I Can't Wait" from the Barbershop 2: Back in Business film soundtrack) and on songs with collaborators such as Beyoncé and Big Boi (on the latter's US No. 1 and UK No. 7 hit "The Way You Move"). Brown independently released his debut solo album, Sleepy's Theme–The Vinyl Room in 1998. He was slated to release an album on the DreamWorks Records label called 'For the Grown and Sexy', but the release was scrapped when DreamWorks label folded.

He is now signed to Big Boi's label Purple Ribbon Records and released his second album, Mr. Brown on October 3, 2006.

Brown is the son of Jimmy Brown, the lead vocalist and saxophonist for the 1970s funk band, Brick.

Discography

Albums
 Society of Soul – Brainchild (1995)
 Sleepy's Theme – The Vinyl Room (1998)
 Phunk-O-Naut (2004)
 Mr. Brown (2006)
 Sex, Drugs, & Soul (2012)
 The Big Sleepover  (2021)

Singles
 2004: "I Can't Wait" (US No. 40, US R&B #18)
 2006: "Margarita" (feat. Big Boi & Pharrell Williams) (US #108)

Featured singles
 2002: "Saturday (Oooh! Ooooh!)" (Ludacris featuring Sleepy Brown) (US No. 22, US R&B No. 10, US Rap No. 5, UK #5)
 2002: "Land of a Million Drums" (Outkast featuring Killer Mike and Sleepy Brown) (US R&B No. 116, UK #46)
 2003: "A.D.I.D.A.S." (Killer Mike featuring Big Boi & Sleepy Brown) (US No. 60, US R&B No. 42, US Rap No. 20, UK #22)
 2003: "The Way You Move" (Outkast featuring Sleepy Brown) (US No. 1, US Pop No. 1, US R&B No. 2, US Rap No. 1, UK #7)
 2005: "The Otherside" (Bubba Sparxxx featuring Petey Pablo and Sleepy Brown)
 2006: "Morris Brown" (Outkast featuring Scar and Sleepy Brown) (US No. 95, US R&B No. 102, UK #43)

Select guest appearances
(excluding songs with the Dungeon Family)

2Pac – "Hennessy" (Red Spyda Remix) (with E.D.I. Mean)
Beyoncé – "Hip-Hop Star" (with Big Boi)
Bow Wow – "Crazy" (with Da Brat)
Da BackWudz – "Mama Always Told Me"
Earth, Wind & Fire – "This Is How I Feel" (with Big Boi and Kelly Rowland)
Field Mob – "Nothing 2 Lose" (with Slimm Calhoun)
Freeway – "Some Say Yes"
Freeway – "Some Say Yes" (remix) (with Fabolous)
Jayo Felony – "So into You"
Jay-Z – "Poppin Tags" (with Killer Mike, Twista, Big Boi and Debra Killings)
Journalist - "Back of Da Lack" (with Backbone A.K.A. Mr. Fat Face 100 of Dungeon Family) 
Kurupt – "Starstruck" (with Cool Breeze, Big Rube and Big Gipp)
Ludacris – "Blueberry Yum Yum"
Ludacris – "Saturday (Oooh! Ooooh!)"
Murphy Lee – "Luv Me Baby" (with Jazze Pha)
Prozack Turner – "American Giant"
Prozack Turner – "El Chepa"
Sly and the Family Stone – "Runnin Away" (with Big Boi and Killer Mike)
Styles P – "Watch Ya Self"
T.I. – "We Pimpin'"
UGK – "Swishas and Erb"
UGK – "Shattered Dreams"
Stacie Orrico – "Knock 'Em Out"

With Dungeon Family
Big Boi – "808" (with Bun B, Big Gee and G-Rock)
Big Gipp – "Steppin Out"
Bubba Sparxxx – "All the Same" (with Backbone)
Bubba Sparxxx – "That Man" (with Duddy Ken)
Bubba Sparxxx – "The Otherside" (with Petey Pablo)
Cool Breeze – "Weeestpointin
Future – "Struggles" (from Superfly) 
Goodie Mob – "Play Yo Flute" (with Kurupt)
Goodie Mob – "Cutty Buddy"
Goodie Mob – "Soul Food"
Joi – "It's Your Life"
Killer Mike – "A.D.I.D.A.S." (with Big Boi)
Outkast – "Bowtie" (with Jazze Pha)
Outkast – "In Your Dreams" (with Killer Mike)
Outkast – "Land of a Million Drums" (with Killer Mike)
Outkast – "Morris Brown" (with Scar)
Outkast – "So Fresh, So Clean" (Remix) (with Snoop Dogg)
Outkast – "Spottieottiedopaliscious"
Outkast – "The Way You Move"
Outkast – "Tough Guy" (with UGK)
Roscoe – "Head to Toe"
Slimm Calhoun – "How Much Can I"
Scar – "If You Want To" (from Superfly)

Filmography
 Idlewild (2006) – Syncopated Church Orchestra

Awards and nominations 

!
|-
|align=center|2001
|Stankonia
|Grammy Award for Album of the Year
|
|
|-
|align=center|1995
|"Waterfalls"
|Grammy Award for Record of the Year
|
|
|-

References

External links
Official website
Official Twitter
Dungeon Family Official Site 
"Margarita" Music Video
Sleepy Brown Interview: September 2006 with Crave Online
 Sleepy Brown interview with Luke Davis (The Situation)

1970 births
Living people
20th-century African-American male singers
21st-century African-American male singers
African-American record producers
African-American male singer-songwriters
American hip hop record producers
American hip hop singers
Dungeon Family members
Musicians from Savannah, Georgia
Southern hip hop musicians
Writers from Savannah, Georgia
Purple Ribbon All-Stars members
Society of Soul members
Singer-songwriters from Georgia (U.S. state)